National Route 33 is a national highway in South Korea connects Goseong to Gumi. It established on 14 March 1981.

Main stopovers
South Gyeongsang Province
 Goseong County - Sacheon - Jinju - Sancheong County - Uiryeong County - Hapcheon County
North Gyeongsang Province
 Goryeong County - Seongju County - Chilgok County - Gumi

Major intersections

 (■): Motorway
IS: Intersection, IC: Interchange

South Gyeongsang Province

North Gyeongsang Province

References

33
Roads in South Gyeongsang
Roads in North Gyeongsang